Chaetomorpha is a genus of green algae in the family Cladophoraceae. Members of this genus may be referred to by the common name sea emerald.

Description
Algae of this genus are made up of macroscopic filaments of cylindrical cells. The genus is characterized by its unbranched filaments, making it distinctive; its closest relatives are branching species of the genus Cladophora.

Species

There are about 50 species. Species include:

 Chaetomorpha adriani
 Chaetomorpha aerea
 Chaetomorpha akineta
 Chaetomorpha antennina
 Chaetomorpha bangioides
 Chaetomorpha basiretrorsa
 Chaetomorpha billardierii
 Chaetomorpha brachygona
 Chaetomorpha californica
 Chaetomorpha cannabina
 Chaetomorpha capillaris
 Chaetomorpha dubyana
 Chaetomorpha elongata
 Chaetomorpha exposita
 Chaetomorpha fibrosa
 Chaetomorpha firma
 Chaetomorpha geniculata
 Chaetomorpha gracilis
 Chaetomorpha henningsii
 Chaetomorpha herbipolensis
 Chaetomorpha intestinalis
 Chaetomorpha irregularis
 Chaetomorpha javanica
 Chaetomorpha kellersii
 Chaetomorpha kerguelensis
 Chaetomorpha ligustica
 Chaetomorpha linoides
 Chaetomorpha linum
 Chaetomorpha macrotona
 Chaetomorpha mawsonii
 Chaetomorpha mediterranea
 Chaetomorpha melagonium 
 Chaetomorpha natalensis
 Chaetomorpha nodosa
 Chaetomorpha obscura
 Chaetomorpha ochlophobians
 Chaetomorpha olneyi
 Chaetomorpha pachynema
 Chaetomorpha pacifica
 Chaetomorpha picquotiana
 Chaetomorpha recurva
 Chaetomorpha restricta
 Chaetomorpha saccata
 Chaetomorpha septentrionalis
 Chaetomorpha tenuissima
 Chaetomorpha tokyoensis
 Chaetomorpha tortuosa
 Chaetomorpha valida
 Chaetomorpha vieillardii
 Chaetomorpha zernovii

Uses
These algae are popular with aquarium hobbyists. Dumping of aquarium specimens into waterways has led to the establishment of nonnative Chaetomorpha populations, which degrades ecosystems when the algae become invasive species. Biologists recommend boiling, microwaving, freezing, or desiccating aquarium Chaetomorpha before disposing of it to avoid inadvertent releases.

References

Cladophorales genera
Cladophoraceae
Taxa named by Friedrich Traugott Kützing